J. L. N. Stadium is a station of Kochi Metro. It was opened on 3 October 2017 as a part of the extension of the metro system from Palarivattom to Maharaja's College. The station is located between Palarivattom and Kaloor. The name of the station is given because of the Jawaharlal Nehru Stadium.

References

Kochi Metro stations
Railway stations in India opened in 2017